The 1974 American Airlines Tennis Games was a men's tennis tournament played on outdoor hard courts. It was the 1st edition of the Indian Wells Masters and was an ATP sanctioned tournament but was not part of the WCT or Grand Prix seasons. The tournament was played in Tucson, Arizona in the United States and ran from March 18 through March 24, 1974. First-seeded John Newcombe won the singles title and $25,000 first-prize money.

Finals

Men's singles 

 John Newcombe defeated    Arthur Ashe 6–3, 7–6

Men's doubles 

 Charlie Pasarell /  Sherwood Stewart defeated  Tom Edlefsen /  Manuel Orantes 6–4, 6–4

References

External links
 
 ITF tournament edition details

 
American Airlines Tennis Games
American Airlines Tennis Games
Indian Wells Masters
1974 Grand Prix (tennis)
1974 in American tennis